Four ships of the Royal Navy have been named HMS Redoubt, for the redoubt, a type of enclosed fort:

 was a 20-gun floating battery, formerly the civilian Rover. She was purchased in 1793 and sold in 1802.
 was an  launched in 1916 and sold in 1926.
 was an R-class destroyer launched in 1942 and transferred to the Indian Navy in 1949 as Ranjit.
 was a Mark 8 Landing Craft Tank launched in 1945 as LCT 4001, named Redoubt in 1956 and sold in 1966 as the ferry Dimitris.

Redoubt